Dil Hi To Hai may refer to:

 Dil Hi To Hai (1963 film)
 Dil Hi To Hai (1992 film)
 Dil Hi To Hai (Drama) on Express Entertainment Pakistan